Guilherme Arantes is a Brazilian singer-songwriter and pianist. He is Steinway Artist.

As a teenager, he was a member of the band Os Polissonantes, which also featured Brazilian actor Kadu Moliterno on bass guitar. In 1969, Arantes started the band Moto Perpétuo with fellow students from USP's architecture course.

It was with Moto Perpétuo that Arantes got his first taste of touring and recording in a studio. The band split up in 1974 as Arantes wanted to pursue a more commercial, pop style of music.

Arantes dropped out of university to dedicate himself to his solo career, and in 1976, his song "Meu Mundo e Nada Mais" (My world and nothing more) was picked by Rede Globo to feature in the soundtrack for the telenovela Anjo Mau. The song was a hit, and Arantes toured the country for the first time.

His first self-titled album was released the same year on Globo's Som Livre label. The song "Cuide-se Bem" (Take good care) from the same record, was also picked by Globo for another telenovela, Duas Vidas. Arantes went on to write another 23 songs for Globo's telenovelas, with most of them becoming radio hits. Besides his solo work, he has also written songs for artists such as Gang 90 & Absurdettes, Elis Regina, Marina Lima and Maria Bethânia.

His album Flores & Cores (Flowers & Colors) was elected the 13th best Brazilian album of 2017 by the Brazilian edition of Rolling Stone.

Discography
 Moto Perpétuo (1974) as a member of Moto Perpétuo.
 Guilherme Arantes (1976)
 Ronda Noturna (1977)
 A Cara e a Coragem (1978)
 Guilherme Arantes (1979)
 Coração Paulista (1980)
 Guilherme Arantes (1982)
 Ligação (1983)
 Despertar (1985)
 Calor (1986)
 Guilherme Arantes (1987)
 Romances Modernos (1989)
 Pão (1990)
 Meu Mundo e Tudo Mais (1990)
 Crescente (1992), Castelos (1993)
 Clássicos (1994)
 Outras Cores (1996)
 Maioridade (1997)
 Guilherme Arantes (1999)
 New Classical Piano Solos (2000)
 Guilherme Arantes – Ao Vivo (2001)
 Aprendiz (2003)
 Lótus (2007)
 Piano Solos (2011)
 Condição Humana (2013)
 Flores & Cores (2017)

References

1953 births
Living people
Brazilian pianists
21st-century Brazilian male singers
21st-century Brazilian singers
Singers from São Paulo
Música Popular Brasileira singers
Male pianists
21st-century pianists
20th-century Brazilian male singers
20th-century Brazilian singers